The Pontianak Sultanate (Malay: كسلطانن ڤونتيناك, Kesultanan Pontianak) was an Islamic Malay state that existed on the western coast of the island of Borneo from the late 18th century until its disestablishment in 1950. The Sultanate was located at the mouth of the Kapuas river in what is today the Indonesian province of West Kalimantan, and the Sultan's residential palace was situated in what later grew to become the modern-day Indonesian city of Pontianak.

History
The Pontianak Sultanate was founded in 1771 by explorers from Hadhramaut led by al-Sayyid Syarif Abdurrahman al-Kadrie, descendant of Imam Ali al-Uraidhi ibn Ja'far al-Sadiq. He had two political marriages in Kalimantan, first with the daughter of Panembahan Mempawah and then with the daughter of the Sultan of Banjar.

After the explorers arrived in Pontianak, they established the Kadariah Palace and received endorsement as the Sultan of Pontianak by the Dutch East India Company in 1779.

The Pontianak Sultanate had friendly relations with the Lanfang Republic.

Pontianak Sultan Syarif Muhammad Alkadrie was executed by the Japanese in the Pontianak incident along with all the other Malay Sultans of Kalimantan. Two of his sons were also beheaded by the Japanese.

The last Sultan was Syarif Hamid Alkadrie, had earlier been interned by the occupying Japanese forces. He supported Federal state of RIS, with his design of Garuda Pancasila adopted as National emblem of Indonesia. He was deposed when he was involved in a coup d'état attempt of APRA led by Raymond Westerling.

List of Sultans of Pontianak

Family Tree

References

melayuonline.com

Further reading 

1950 disestablishments in Indonesia
States and territories established in 1771
P
West Kalimantan
Precolonial states of Indonesia
Islamic states in Indonesia
States and territories disestablished in 1950
Former sultanates
Pontianak